The Rhode Island Center for Freedom and Prosperity (RICFP) is a public policy think tank located in Rhode Island that seeks to advance free market ideas. According to the organization, it "is dedicated to providing concerned citizens, the media, and public officials with empirical research data, while also advancing free-market solutions to public policy issues in the state." 

RICFP is headed by former major league baseball player Mike Stenhouse. Stenhouse formerly ran the Ocean State Policy Research Institute, a Rhode Island think tank that ceased operations in 2011. 

The organization is active in policy areas including tax policy, business climate, health care, pension reform and job growth. In June 2012, the organization issued a report arguing that Rhode Island should eliminate its 7-percent tax to stimulate the state’s struggling economy. RICFP later worked with Democratic state legislator Jan Malik on tax reduction proposals in the Rhode Island Legislature. The organization publishes government transparency data, including municipal and school district spending as well as public employee compensation.

See also
State Policy Network

References

External links
Rhode Island Center for Freedom and Prosperity website

501(c)(3) organizations
Non-profit organizations based in Rhode Island
Political and economic think tanks in the United States
Think tanks established in 2011